Soamanandrariny is a rural commune in Madagascar. It belongs to the district of Antanifotsy, which is a part of Vakinankaratra Region. The population of the commune was 24,003 in 2018.

Primary and junior level secondary education are available in town. The majority 99% of the population of the commune are farmers.  The most important crops are potatoes and tobacco; also rice is an important agricultural product. Services provide employment for 1% of the population.

References 

Populated places in Vakinankaratra